China Tang is a Chinese restaurant located at 53 Park Lane in London which was owned by entrepreneur David Tang (until his death in 2017) and was opened in 2005. It is located within the Dorchester Hotel and the nearest London Underground station is Hyde Park Corner.

Overview
The restaurant is designed with an Art Deco style lounge bar reminiscent of 1930s Shanghai. Well-known people have been seen there, including Kate Moss and Tony Blair. Some charity events have been hosted here, as well as fundraising events for the Television Trust for the Environment.

See also
 List of Chinese restaurants

References

Further reading

External links
 China Tang
 The free company report: http://intercreditreport.com/company/china-tang-london-limited-04483789 .

2005 establishments in England
Chinese restaurants in London
Restaurants established in 2005